Berndt August Hjorth (1862 in Finland – 1937 in Stockholm) was a Swedish businessman, the founder of Bahco group.

Berndt August Hjorth came to Sweden in 1881. In 1889 he opened a tools and machinery shop in Stockholm, BA Hjorth & Co, incorporated as a shareholder company in 1916 and in 1954 renamed Bahco. The following year, he made an exclusive contract with Johan Petter Johansson to market his invention, an adjustable spanner.

In 1892, Hjorth acquired sole rights to another Swedish invention, the Primus stove, patented by Frans Wilhelm Lindqvist. In 1918, Hjorth acquired the Primus factory on Lilla Essingen island in western Stockholm.

In Stockholm, Hjorth lived at Villagatan 15 in Villastaden, a wealthy part of Östermalm.
In the early 1930s, he built his own "Villa Hjorth" in Diplomatstaden also in Östermalm.

References

Bahco lägger ned tillverkningen i Enköping, article in Ny Teknik on February 17, 2006.
Berndt August Hjort 1862-1937, presented by "Skiftnyckelns vänner", Vårgårda.

External links
Bahco group

Swedish businesspeople
Swedish people of Finnish descent
1862 births
1937 deaths